Ole Siem (11 January 1882 – 1979) was a Norwegian naval officer, businessman and politician.

Personal life
Siem was born in Trondheim to Martin Olsen Siem and Gjertrud Christlock. He married Marie Augusta Ursin Holm in 1912, and was the father of Martin Siem.

Career
Siem took actively part in local politics, and was elected to the municipal council in Horten (1925–1928), Tromsø (1931–1934) and Hadsel (1937–1940). He was director of Troms Fylkes Dampskibsselskap from 1929 to 1934, and of Vesteraalens Dampskibsselskab from 1936 to 1950.

During the Battles of Narvik in 1940 he served with the 6th Division, as head of the sea transport. During the German occupation of Norway he was among the resistance pioneers in Northern Norway. He was incarcerated at Ånebyleiren and then Grini from April to July 1941, as a "Svolvær hostage". He was later arrested by the Gestapo in December 1942, but was transferred to the Wehrmacht as prisoner-of-war in 1943 when about 1,100 Norwegian military officers were sent to prisoner-of-war camps in Poland and Germany for the rest of the war.

He was decorated Knight, First Class of the Order of St. Olav in 1946. He was Officer of the French Legion of Honour, recipient of the Polish Virtuti Militari, 4th Class, and of the Turkish Liakat Medal.

References

1882 births
1979 deaths
People from Trondheim
Royal Norwegian Navy personnel of World War II
Norwegian resistance members
Norwegian businesspeople in shipping
Grini concentration camp survivors
Norwegian prisoners of war in World War II
World War II prisoners of war held by Germany
Vestfold politicians
Politicians from Tromsø
Nordland politicians
Officiers of the Légion d'honneur
Recipients of the Virtuti Militari
Recipients of the Liakat Medal